The Legendary Profile is an album by American jazz group the Modern Jazz Quartet recorded in 1972 and released on the Atlantic label.

Reception
The Allmusic review stated "This is an MJQ album that, for most fans, is somewhat off their beaten path. At a time when they had left Apple records, returning to the Atlantic label, and when fusion was just getting started, the group incorporates more Brazilian music in the mix, and John Lewis plays Fender Rhodes electric piano on two tracks... Not an essential item in their catalog, this is reserved strictly for completists".

Track listing
All compositions by John Lewis except as indicated
 "The Legendary Profile" (Milt Jackson) - 4:53   
 "Valeria" - 4:30   
 "Misty Roses" (Tim Hardin) -  6:54   
 "The Martyr" (Jackson) - 6:41   
 "What Now My Love (Et Maintenant)" (Gilbert Bécaud, Carl Sigman) - 5:42   
 "Romance" - 6:57

Personnel
Milt Jackson - vibraphone
John Lewis - piano, electric piano
Percy Heath - bass
Connie Kay - drums

References

Atlantic Records albums
Modern Jazz Quartet albums
1972 albums